The World Group was the highest level of Fed Cup competition in 1997. Eight nations competed in a three-round knockout competition. United States was the defending champion, but they were defeated in the first round by the Netherlands. France ended up capturing their first title, defeating the Netherlands in the final.

Participating Teams

Draw

First round

United States vs. Netherlands

Czech Republic vs. Germany

France vs. Japan

 This tie holds the Fed Cup record for the most games, with 172.

Belgium vs. Spain

Semifinals

Czech Republic vs. Netherlands

France vs. Belgium

Final

Netherlands vs. France

References

See also
Fed Cup structure

World Group